A Lotus for Miss Quon is a 1961 thriller novel by the British writer James Hadley Chase.

Film adaptation
In 1967 it was made into the West German film Lotus Flowers for Miss Quon directed by Jürgen Roland and starring Lang Jeffries, Francesca Tu and Werner Peters. This was part of a boom in adaptations of British crime writers including Chase and Edgar Wallace.

References

Bibliography
 Goble, Alan. The Complete Index to Literary Sources in Film. Walter de Gruyter, 1999.
 Kelleghan, Fiona. 100 Masters of Mystery and Detective Fiction: Baynard H. Kendrick - Israel Zangwill, Volume 2. Salem Press, 2001.

1961 British novels
Novels by James Hadley Chase
British thriller novels
British novels adapted into films
Robert Hale books